Heneage Montagu (16 November 1675 – April 1698) was a younger son of Robert Montagu, 3rd Earl of Manchester and Anne Yelverton. He was a knight of the shire from Huntingdonshire from 1695 until his death in 1698.

1675 births
1698 deaths
Heneage Montagu
English MPs 1695–1698
Younger sons of earls
Masters of the Jewel Office